Mats Goberg Solheim (born 3 December 1987) is a  former Norwegian footballer who played as a defender.

Career

Sogndal
Solheim started his career at the local club Loen IL, continuing at Stryn TIL in the lower divisions. He initially played as a striker. He attracted interest from the professional club Sogndal, then playing in the Norwegian second tier, during the summer of 2006. He subsequently joined the club and went on to enjoy a promotion to Tippeligaen four seasons later, in 2010.

During his time at Sogndal he got known as a utility player, being used in almost every outfield position. He has since established himself as a natural wing back on either flanks.

Solheim played a total of 25 games, scoring 4 times, during the 2011 Tippeligaen-season. He attracted interest from several other Norwegian clubs after the successful campaign, but opted to move abroad, signing for Kalmar FF in the Swedish Allsvenskan.

Kalmar FF
He had a rough start to his stint at Kalmar FF, when he injured his anterior cruciate ligament in February 2012 during the pre-season. He was forced to the sideline throughout the rest of the year.

Solheim made his competitive debut for Kalmar on 2 April 2013 against Syrianska FC, on the first match day of the 2013 Allsvenskan. He crowned his debut for the side by scoring in a 3–0 victory. He played as a regular at Kalmar during the upcoming two seasons, featuring in a total of 50 games in Allsvenskan, scoring on 5 occasions.

Hammarby IF
On 31 March 2015, the last day of the Swedish transfer window, Hammarby IF announced that they had signed Solheim on a three year-contract. He reunited with his former manager Nanne Bergstrand, who first had brought him to Sweden, at the Stockholm-based outfit.

Solheim established himself as a first choice left defender at Hammarby during the 2015 season. He missed out on the whole first half of the 2016 season due to another, less serious, knee injury.

Stabæk
In November 2019, Solheim returned to Norwegian football, joining Stabæk on a three-year contract. He retired in August 2021 to become a banker.

Career statistics

Honours
Sogndal
 Norwegian First Division: 2010

References

External links
Mats Solheim at NIFS 

1987 births
Living people
People from Stryn
Norwegian footballers
Stryn TIL players
Sogndal Fotball players
Kalmar FF players
Hammarby Fotboll players
Stabæk Fotball players
Norwegian First Division players
Eliteserien players
Allsvenskan players
Norwegian expatriate footballers
Expatriate footballers in Sweden
Norwegian expatriate sportspeople in Sweden
Association football utility players
Association football defenders
Sportspeople from Vestland